Cavanagh or Cavanaugh is a surname of Irish origin, a variation of the Irish family surname Caomhánach.

Surname origin

Cavanagh and its variations are anglicisations of the Irish surname Caomhánach ( in traditional Gaelic type). The surname was first assumed by Domhnall, eldest son of the 12th century King of Leinster, Diarmait Mac Murchada in Ireland.

A considerable number of anglicised variations of Caomhánach exist, with some of the most common being: "Kavanagh", "Cavanagh", "Kavanaugh" and "Cavanaugh".

Spelling variations
Clann Chaomhánach/Cavanagh covers the following known variations of the family name: Kavanagh, Kavanaugh, Kavanah, Kavenah, Kabana, Kavaner, Kavenaugh, Kavanacht, Kaveny, Kevane, Cavanaugh, Cavanah, Cavenah, Cavana, Cavana, Cavner, Cavenaugh, Cavender, Cavenogh, Cavnar, Cavignac, Cavanaogh, Cavanogh, Cabanah, Chaomhana, Cowand and many others...

Cavanagh
List of people with the surname Cavanagh:
 Clare Cavanagh
 Daniel Cavanagh (born 1972), Jamie Cavanagh, and Vincent Cavanagh (born 1973), brothers in the band Anathema
 Daniel Cavanagh (bishop), Bishop of Leighlin
 Daniel Cavanagh (politician), American politician
 David Cavanagh (died 2018), Irish writer
 Dawn Cavanagh, South African women's rights activist
 Dean Cavanagh, journalist, author and screenwriter
 Diego Cavanagh (1905-1977), Argentinian Polo Player and Olympic Gold Medalist
 Frank Cavanagh, former bass player for Filter
 Hollie Cavanagh (born 1993), British singer
 James Cavanagh (disambiguation), various people
 Jerome Cavanagh (1928–1979), American politician from Detroit, Michigan
 John Cavanagh (disambiguation), various people
 Katy Cavanagh (born 1973), English actress
 Kit Cavanagh (died 1739), male impersonator who fought as a soldier in the 1690s
 Lucy Mary Cavanagh (1871–1936), American botanist
 Mary Cavanagh, American politician
 Megan Cavanagh (born 1960), American actress
 Michael Cavanagh (architect), Australian architect
 Michael Cavanagh (judge), American judge from Michigan
 Patrick Cavanagh (died 1581), Irish Catholic martyr
 Paul Cavanagh (1888–1964), English film actor
 Peter Cavanagh (born 1981), English footballer
 Roberto Cavanagh (1914-2002), Argentinian polo player
 Sean Cavanagh (born 1983), Irish Gaelic footballer
 Terry Cavanagh (politician), Canadian politician
 Terry Cavanagh (developer), Irish video game designer
 Tim Cavanagh, comedy songwriter
 Tom Cavanagh (born 1963), Canadian actor

Cavanaugh
List of people with the surname Cavanaugh:

 Carey Cavanaugh, former United States ambassador
 Christine Cavanaugh (1963–2014), American voice actor
 Colleen Cavanaugh is a microbiologist and Edward C. Jeffrey Professor of Biology at Harvard University.
 Dan Cavanaugh, a retired American professional ice hockey player.
 Dave Cavanaugh (1919–1981), American composer and musician
 Dennis M. Cavanaugh, a United States District Judge in the District Court of New Jersey.
 Frank Cavanaugh (American football)
 Hobart Cavanaugh (1886–1950), an American character actor in films and on stage.
 James M. Cavanaugh (1823–1879), representative for Minnesota and delegate from the Territory of Montana
 Jay Cavanaugh (1949–2005), marijuana activist
 John Cavanaugh (baseball) (1900–1961), MLB player
 John Cavanaugh (sculptor) (1921–1985)
 John J. Cavanaugh, Roman Catholic priest and former president of the University of Notre Dame
 John Joseph Cavanaugh III, politician from Nebraska
 John R. Cavanaugh (1929–2007), American priest and scholar, retired faculty member of St. John Fisher College
 Linda Cavanaugh, an award-winning newscaster for NBC affiliate KFOR-TV (channel 4), in Oklahoma City, Oklahoma.
 Matt Cavanaugh, former American football quarterback in the NFL who played from 1979 to 1991
 Michael Cavanaugh, an actor, musician and singer.
 Michael Cavanaugh, American TV and film actor, notable for 24
 Page Cavanaugh (1922–2008), an American jazz and pop pianist, vocalist, and arranger.
 Patrick Cavanaugh, an American television actor.
 Thomas Cavanaugh, American Medal of Honor recipient
 Tim Cavanaugh, American journalist and blogger, web editor of the Los Angeles Times opinion page

Fictional characters
 Liam and Leanna Cavanagh, characters from Emmerdale, a British soap opera.
 Jordan Cavanaugh, character from Crossing Jordan, an American television drama.
 Toby Cavanaugh, character from Pretty Little Liars, an American television drama.
 Alicia Florrick (née Cavanaugh), character from The Good Wife, an American television drama.
 Miles Cavanaugh, character from The Edge of Night, an American television soap opera.
 Sally Ann Cavanaugh, character from Fletch, an American comedy film.
 Johnny Cavanagh, character in the story The Shepherd, by Frederick Forsyth.
 The title characters from The Cavanaughs, an American television sitcom.
 James Kavanagh, the main character in Kavanagh QC, a British television drama.
 Detective Cavanaugh, a side character in iZombie, played by Robert Salvador

See also
 Caomhánach, about the family origins
 Kavanagh (surname)
 Kings of Leinster
 Uí Ceinnselaig

References

Surnames of Irish origin